Brandt's bat or Brandt's myotis (Myotis brandtii) is a species of vesper bat in the family Vespertilionidae. It is native throughout most of Europe and parts of western Asia.

Taxonomy and etymology
The species was described in 1845 by German zoologist Eduard Friedrich Eversmann, who placed it the genus Vespertilio.
For a time, the Brandt's bat was considered a subspecies of the whiskered bat, Myotis mystacinus.
In 1958, one author proposed that the two might be separate species, based on baculum differences; this idea gained traction in papers authored in 1970 and 1971.
It is named for the German zoologist Johann Friedrich von Brandt.

Formerly, populations in central and eastern Asia were classified in this species. However, more recent studies indicate that they form a distinct species, the Siberian bat (Myotis sibiricus).

Range and habitat
It is found throughout Europe and western Asia, and can be found in the following regions: Great Britain, Western Europe, Central Europe, Fennoscandia, and western Russia. In the Balkans it is limited to the mountains. In 2010, Brandt's bat was documented in Ireland for the first time. It can be found in deciduous forests, or forests that are a mix of deciduous and coniferous trees. It is often found in close proximity to water.

Description 
It has dark gray or brown fur that is grayish underneath with golden tips. The face and the tips of ears are pinkish in color.

Biology

Like primates and other bats, the Brandt's bat has lost the ability to synthesize vitamin C.

Reproduction
During the summer, females will form maternity colonies to raise their young. The litter size is one pup.  Pups are born in early summer, with pups becoming volant around one month of age. Maternity colonies have also been found in tree cavities and in bat houses.  Some females reach sexual maturity at three months of age, but most do not breed until after reaching a year of age.  Mating occurs in the fall, but females store the sperm until the spring, which is when fertilization occurs.

Longevity
Brandt's bats had previously been reported to have very long lifespans nearing 40 years, but these populations have since been reclassified into a different species, the Siberian bat (Myotis sibiricus). Populations of Brandt's bat do not have as long life expectancies as the Siberian bat. Populations of Brandt's bat near Saint Petersburg live approximately 8.5 years; populations in the Baltic region do not live longer than 18.5 years.  However, researchers have also identified molecular evidence for long lifespans in true Brandt's bats, including changes in growth hormone receptors and insulin-like growth factor 1 receptors that likely contribute to a long life expectancy. By roosting in caves, it is able to avoid extreme weather conditions and predators, increasing its chances of living a long life.  It also hibernates, which is linked to longer life expectancies in bats.

Senses
Like other echolocating bats that use echolocation to detect prey instead of other senses, it has a reduction in the number of genes responsible for the sense of smell. Its eyes are small and adapted to vision in low-light levels. They are likely totally or partially color-blind, and likely unable to see clearly in bright daylight. The frequencies used by this bat species for echolocation lie between 32 and 103 kHz, have maximum energy density at 51 kHz and have an average duration of 4.2 ms.

Conservation
It is currently evaluated as least concern by the IUCN. It meets the criteria for this designation because it is an abundant, widespread species, with no indication of a decline in its population. Like all bat species in Europe, the Brandt's bat is a European Protected Species, meaning that it is illegal to deliberately capture, kill, injure, or disturb individuals; in addition, their roosts are protected as "breeding or resting" places.

References

External links 
ARkive Photographs

Mouse-eared bats
Bats of Europe
Mammals of Russia
Mammals of Turkey
Taxa named by Eduard Friedrich Eversmann
Mammals described in 1845
Bats of Asia
Taxonomy articles created by Polbot